William Child was a composer.

William Child may also refer to:

William Child (boxer), British boxer
William Child (MP) (died c.1398), MP for New Romney
William Child of Northwick, High Sheriff of Worcestershire in 1586 or 1587
William Child, High Sheriff of Shropshire in 1784
William Child, owner and 16th-century Lord of Cofton Hackett

See also
William Child-Villiers
William Childs (disambiguation)